The Autosport Awards are a series of awards presented by motor racing magazine Autosport to drivers that have achieved significant milestones each season. Some of the presentations are selected by the general public via a reader's poll. The awards have been presented every year since 1982.

Categories
There are 14 awards made by the magazine – eight of which selected by popular vote and the balance chosen by a panel of experts including Autosport journalists (McLaren Autosport BRDC Award). These are:
 McLaren Autosport BRDC Award
 International Racing Driver of the Year
 International Rally Driver of the Year
 Richard Mille Rookie of the Year
 Racing Car of the Year
 Rally Car of the Year
 Rider of the Year
 British Competition Driver of the Year
 National Driver of the Year (combined for 2008: 1982–2007 saw an award for National Racing Driver and National Rally Driver)
 British Club Driver of the Year
 John Bolster Award
 Gregor Grant Award
 Autosport Williams Engineer of the Future

Previous winners

Aston Martin Autosport BRDC Award

International Racing Driver Award

International Rally Driver Award

National Driver of the Year
 formerly given separately, but combined for 2008. The winner receives the Paul Warwick Memorial Trophy.

Racing Car of the Year

Rally Car of the Year

British Competition Driver of the Year

Rookie of the Year

Moment of the Year

Pioneering and Innovation Award

John Bolster Award for technical achievement
Named in honour of the technical editor of Autosport from 1950 to 1984.

Gregor Grant Award

Rider of the Year

Esports Driver of the Year

Gold Medal Award

Former awards

British Club Driver of the Year

Sportsman Award

References

Auto racing trophies and awards